Fautor metivieri is a species of sea snail, a marine gastropod mollusk, in the family Calliostomatidae within the superfamily Trochoidea, the top snails, turban snails and their allies.

Distribution
This marine species occurs off New Caledonia.

References

 Vilvens, C., 2009. New species and new records of Calliostomatidae (Gastropoda: Trochoidea) from New Caledonia and Solomon Islands. Novapex 10(4): 125-163

Calliostomatidae
Gastropods described in 1995